ini-ye Sofla (also Romanized as Īnī-ye Soflá and Īnī Soflá; also known as īnī-ye Pā’īn and īnī-ye Pā’īn) is a village in Īni Rural District, in the Central District of Germi County, Ardabil Province, Iran. At the 2006 census, its population was 550, in 104 families.

References 

Towns and villages in Germi County